Elizabeth Kerr (August 15, 1912 – January 13, 2000) was an American actress, theatre producer and director.

Early years 
Kerr was born in Kansas City, Missouri, the daughter of John and Anna Kerr. She attended Northwestern University and the University of Kansas. As a girl, she dreamed of being an actress, but family responsibilities prevented her from doing so until she was a grandmother. After she married, she wrote reviews of books and plays for the newspaper that she and her husband owned. She also read book reviews at meetings of women's clubs, which she said helped to prepare her for acting.

Career
Kerr's acting career began at the Pasadena Playhouse. She was selected for a role there after her first audition, and in two years she became a professional.

Kerr's Broadway debut came in Angel in the Pawnshop (1951). Her other Broadway credits included The Conquering Hero (1961), Redhead (1959), and The Righteous Are Bold (1955). She also made national tours of a similar number of plays, besides performing in regional theatrical productions.

On television, Kerr played Mother Elliott in The Betty White Show, and Cora Hudson in Mork & Mindy.

Kerr also produced plays. She founded the Glendale Civic Theater in 1947 and launched the Resident Theater in North Hollywood in 1952. She also directed at the Resident Theater.

References

External links

1912 births
2000 deaths
Actresses from Kansas City, Missouri
20th-century American actresses
American stage actresses
American television actresses
American theatre managers and producers
Northwestern University alumni
University of Kansas alumni